{{DISPLAYTITLE:C10H6O8}}
The molecular formula C10H6O8 may refer to:

Hexahydroxy-1,4-naphthalenedione (spinochrome E)
Hexahydroxy-1,2-naphthalenedione
Hexahydroxy-2,3-naphthalenedione
Hexahydroxy-2,6-naphthalenedione
Pyromellitic acid